El Poal is a village of Pla d'Urgell, Catalonia, Spain.

Geography

El Poal is approximately located five miles south from Mollerussa, capital of the region, specifically along the shore of the Urgell Canal. El Poal borders on Linyola to the north, Palau d’Anglesola to the south, Vila-sana to the east and Bellvís to the west.

Altitude: 215 metres
Surface: 9 square km
Population: 660 inhabitants

Throughout this fertile plain irrigated crops such as fodder, maize, cereals and fruit trees are cultivated. The economy of the village is complemented by stockbreeding. Minor occupation is focused on industry and services.

Demographic evolution

Special events, fairs and celebrations
Annual Town Celebration and Sona El Poal Festival (electronic nights with video projections along the town): 24 August
Carnival 2006: 24th and 25 February (big fire organized by the youth, popular dinner and traditional dances)
Annual Celebration of El Roser: 2nd weekend of May
Annual Celebration of Joan Baptista: 3rd weekend of August
National Day of Catalonia: 11 September (popular sardine dinner with habaneras party in the swimming-pool)

References

External links
El Poal webpage
 Government data pages 

Municipalities in Pla d'Urgell
Populated places in Pla d'Urgell